Cerithideopsis is a genus of medium-sized sea snails or mud snails, marine gastropod mollusks in the family Potamididae, the horn snails. 

This genus was previously considered a subspecies of Cerithidea Swainson, 1840

Species
 Cerithideopsis australiensis Reid & Claremont, 2014
 Cerithideopsis californica (Haldeman, 1840) - California hornsnail 
 Cerithideopsis costata (E. M. da Costa, 1778) - costate hornsnail
 Cerithideopsis fuscata (Gould, 1857)
 Cerithideopsis largillierti (Philippi, 1848)
 Cerithideopsis malayensis Reid & Claremont, 2014
 Cerithideopsis montagnei (Orbigny, 1839)<!--1837 per ITIS-->
 Cerithideopsis pliculosa (Menke, 1829) - plicate hornsnail - type species of genus Cerithideopsis
 Cerithideopsis pulchra (C. B. Adams, 1852)
 Cerithideopsis scalariformis (Say, 1825) - ladder hornsnail

References

 Reid D.G. & Claremont M. (2014) The genus Cerithideopsis Thiele, 1929 (Gastropoda: Potamididae) in the Indo-West Pacific region. Zootaxa 3779(1): 61-80

External links

Potamididae
Gastropod genera